The Upper Missouri River Breaks National Monument is a national monument in the western United States, protecting the Missouri Breaks of north central Montana. Managed by the Bureau of Land Management (BLM), it is a series of badland areas characterized by rock outcroppings, steep bluffs, and grassy plains; a topography referred to as "The Breaks" by locals (as the land appears to "break away" to the river).

Created by proclamation in 2001 by President Bill Clinton on January 17, it encompasses , of public lands, most of which were already managed by the federal government. The adjacent Missouri River was designated a Wild and Scenic River in 1976 and forms a western boundary while the Charles M. Russell National Wildlife Refuge is to the east. The Breaks country was a model for many of the paintings done by painter Charles M. Russell.

History 
French trappers found the area in the late 18th century peopled by Native American tribes such as the Blackfoot, Northern Cheyenne, Sioux, Assiniboine, Gros Ventre (Atsina), Crow, Plains Cree, and Plains Ojibwa. (The Crow name is Xuáhcheesh Annáppiio, "Where the Crow warrior Skunk was killed.")

The Lewis and Clark Expedition passed through the Breaks in 1805 and were the first to document the region through notes and drawings, and their sighting and documentation of bighorn sheep in the Breaks region was the first time this species was recorded in North America by white explorers. Much of the Breaks region has remained as it was when Lewis and Clark's party first saw it. The confluence of the Judith and Missouri Rivers was the setting for important peace councils in 1846 and 1855.

In 1877, the eastbound Nez Perce crossed the Missouri and entered the Breaks country in their attempt to escape to Canada. The Cow Island Skirmish occurred in the Breaks and was the last encounter prior to the Nez Perce's surrender to the U.S. Army at the Battle of Bear Paw, just north of the monument."

Management and conservation
A full management plan is still under development due to various private inholdings and lease agreements between private citizens and the federal government. While conservationists would like to see some of the Breaks monument lands become designated as Wilderness, local ranchers and farmers under long standing lease agreements with the federal government, who graze upwards of 10,000 head of cattle annually within the new monument, are concerned that the monument status may adversely affect their livelihood and the economies of local towns.

Under the proposed management plan from the Department of the Interior, although the resources of the monument will be given better protection, "currently permitted livestock grazing, hunting, fishing, and similar activities will generally not be affected, nor will private property (approximately ) and state land (approximately ) within the boundary of the proposed monument, as well as other valid existing rights."

In 2013, the U.S. Court of Appeals ruled that the BLM's management plan violated historic site laws with their practices.   The National Trust for Historic Preservation cited the site as one of ten historic sites saved in 2013.

The Breaks is home to at least sixty mammal species and hundreds of bird species. Willows and shrubs are found along the Missouri River banks while sagebrush and short grass prairie are dominant elsewhere.

See also
 List of national monuments of the United States
 Montana Wilderness Association
 The Missouri Breaks - a 1976 western film centered around this area.
 Fred Robinson Bridge: A bridge over the Missouri within the monument boundaries

References

External links

 
 
 
 Map Bureau of Land Management
 Friends of the Missouri Breaks
   G.Auble, M. Scott: Cottonwood in the Missouri Breaks National Monument. USGS publications. (PDF)

Missouri River
National Monuments in Montana
Bureau of Land Management National Monuments
Bureau of Land Management areas in Montana
Protected areas of Chouteau County, Montana
Protected areas of Fergus County, Montana
Protected areas of Blaine County, Montana
Protected areas of Phillips County, Montana
2001 establishments in Montana
Protected areas established in 2001
Units of the National Landscape Conservation System